Dinefwr Estate is a Site of Special Scientific Interest in Carmarthen & Dinefwr,  Wales. Much of the site is a deer park with veteran trees.

See also
List of Sites of Special Scientific Interest in Carmarthen & Dinefwr

References

Sites of Special Scientific Interest in Carmarthen & Dinefwr